Stefan Schaefer is an American writer, director and producer of films and television.

Biography

Early life and education 
Schaefer was born in Boston, spent his childhood in Sussex, England and his adolescent years in Michigan and New York. He studied acting and political theory at Skidmore College and Wesleyan University, from which he graduated Phi Beta Kappa. Following a year and a half in Germany—where he studied as a Fulbright Scholar at the University of Kiel—he returned to New York and co-founded the production company Cicala Filmworks.

He is the maternal grandson of polar explorer and ornithologist Carl R. Eklund.

Career
Schaefer's films have premiered and won awards at festivals such as the Berlin International Film Festival and SxSW, among many others, and have been successfully released theatrically and via outlets such as NetFlix, Amazon Prime, Hulu, HBO, PBS and the Sundance Channel.

He has over fifteen feature film credits to his name, among them My Last Day Without You, The Amazing Truth About Queen Raquela, and Arranged. On these and other projects he's worked with Academy Award winner Melissa Leo, Ali Larter, Zoe Lister-Jones, Ken Duken, Nicole Beharie, David Harbour, Michael Imperioli, and many more. In addition to these indie features, Schaefer and writing partner Christoph Silber wrote four TV movies for leading European networks ARD and ZDF, two of which filmed in Hawai’i.

On the documentary front, Schaefer directed the one-hour television documentary Contested Streets, which looks at what New York can learn from London, Paris and Copenhagen in terms of organizing its streets and public spaces. The film screened widely at environmental film festivals and aired as part of "The Green" series on the Sundance Channel. In 2015, he released a feature documentary on Poet Laureate and environmental activist W.S. Merwin, entitled "Even Though the Whole World Is Burning". A one-hour version of the film, "W.S. Merwin: To Plant a Tree", was broadcast nationally on PBS in 2016.

Schaefer has developed and sold TV shows and films to Warner Bros., Sony Pictures Television, The Weinstein Company, AMC Networks, Mandeville Films, Big Beach and Abominable Pictures. An active member of the Writers Guild of America, East, he's managed by LA-based Industry Entertainment.

Filmography

Theatrical
 2020/21 - Aloha Surf Hotel (writer/director/producer)
 2017 - Kuleana (producer/actor)
 2015 - Even Though the Whole World Is Burning (writer/director/producer)
 2012/13 - My Last Day Without You (writer/director/producer)
 2011 - The Roundup (short) (writer/director/producer)
 2011 - Get a Job (producer/actor)
 2009 - The Hungry Ghosts (producer/actor)
 2008 - The Higher Force (writer/producer/actor)
 2008 - The Amazing Truth About Queen Raquela (writer/producer/actor)
 2007 - Arranged (writer/director/producer)
 2006 - Act Normal (2006) (co-producer)
 2006 - Contested Streets (director/producer/editor)
 2005 - Confess (writer/director)

Television
 2018 - I Am Because You Are (writer/director/producer)
 2016 - Surf Break Hotel (writer/director/producer)
 2016 - W.S. Merwin: To Plant a Tree (writer/director/producer)
 2015 - Blue Water Living / Blauwasserleben (writer)
 2013 - The Paradise Within / Das Paradies in uns (writer)
 2013 - To Love, Let Go / Wer liebt, lässt los (writer)
 2012 - First Lady / Nicht mit mir, Liebling (writer)
 2009 - Circledrawers (co-creator/producer/actor)

Awards & Nominations
 2022 - Individual Artist Grant from the National Endowment for the Arts and the Hawaii State Foundation on Culture and the Arts. 
 2021 - Hawaii Film Critics Society: Best Hawaii Feature Film Aloha Surf Hotel (nominated)
 2020 - Hawaii International Film Festival: Made-in Hawaii Best Feature Aloha Surf Hotel (nominated)
 2018 - Writer-in-Residence, Can Cab Literary Residence 
 2018 - Maui Film Festival: Best Hawaiian Short Film I Am Because You Are
 2012 - Black Reel Awards: Best Original Song My Last Day Without You (nominated)
 2012 - Black Reel Awards: Best Independent Feature Film My Last Day Without You
 2011 - Brooklyn International Film Festival: Best Producer My Last Day Without You
 2011 - Big Island Film Festival: Audience Choice Award Get A Job
 2008 - Berlin International Film Festival: Teddy Award for Best Feature Film 'The Amazing Truth About Queen Raquela 2008 - Skip City Int'l Film Festival: Grand Prize, $100,000 award for Best Film Arranged 
 2007 - Washington Jewish Film Festival: Audience Award Arranged
 2007 - Berkshire Int'l Film Festival: Audience Award Arranged
 2007 - Brooklyn Int'l Film Festival: Best Film Arranged
 2005 - Best Screenwriter Hamptons International Film Festival, Confess''
 2004 - Grand Prize in Digital Filmmaking from Apple and Panasonic
 2004 - Writer-in-Residence, Omi International Arts Center 
 2003 - New York Foundation for the Arts Fellowship in Screenwriting
 2002 - Berlin Talents, Berlin International Film Festival
 1995 - Fulbright Scholar

References

^ 

^ 

^ 

^ 

^ 

^ 

^ 

^

External links

 , official personal website
 Variety review of film Arranged, Dec. 13, 2007. Accessed 2008-04-22.
 "Arranged Wins Skip City"
 , official website for film "Arranged"
 , official website for film "My Last Day Without You" 
 , official website for web-series "Circledrawers"
 , official website for film "Get A Job"
 , official website for production company "Cicala Filmworks"
 , official website for production company "Silver Shepherd"
 , official website for "Even Though The Whole World is Burning" 
 , official website for "W.S. Merwin: To Plant a Tree"

1971 births
Living people
Writers from Boston
American film directors
Wesleyan University alumni
Waldorf school alumni
American male writers